Stafford is a Legislative Assembly of Queensland electoral district in the state of Queensland, Australia.

It is located in the inner northern residential suburbs of Brisbane. Suburbs in the current electorate include Stafford, Gordon Park, Grange, Kedron, Stafford Heights, and parts of Chermside, Chermside West, McDowall, Alderley, Wilston, Newmarket and Windsor.  The Electorate includes the Prince Charles Hospital.

Stafford was first formed in 1972, when it was won by Labor's Roy Harvey. This changed in 1974 when the seat went to Liberal Terry Gygar. Gygar held the seat until 1983, at which point he lost it to Labor's Denis Murphy, but after Murphy's death Gygar was able to retake the seat at the 1984 Stafford by-election. Gygar was re-elected in 1986 but lost the seat in 1989 to Labor's Rod Welford.

In 1992 the seat was abolished, and Welford moved to Everton. But a redistribution saw the seat recreated in 2001 after Chermside and Kedron were amalgamated. Suburbs in the 2001–2006 electorate included Stafford, Chermside, Gordon Park, Kedron, Lutwyche, Stafford Heights and parts of Albion, Chermside West, Wavell Heights and Wooloowin. Labor's Terry Sullivan held the seat from 2001 to 2006 and Labor's Stirling Hinchliffe until 2012 when Liberal Nationals Chris Davis won the seat.

A 2014 Stafford by-election was held on 19 July as a result of the resignation of Davis. The by-election was won by Labor's Anthony Lynham with a 62 percent two-party vote from a 19.1 percent two-party swing.

Members for Stafford

Election results

References

External links
 

Stafford